Cary Township (also designated Township 4) is one of twenty townships within Wake County, North Carolina, United States. As of the 2010 census, Cary Township had a population of 74,074.

Cary Township, occupying  in western Wake County, includes the bulk of the town of Cary and portions of the town of Apex and the city of Raleigh. Cary Township contains two high schools: Cary High School (public) and Cary Academy (private).

References

Townships in Wake County, North Carolina
Townships in North Carolina